Evteev Glacier is a glacier flowing from the southeast slopes of the Worcester Range to the Ross Ice Shelf, west of Cape Timberlake. It was named by the Advisory Committee on Antarctic Names in 1964 for Sveneld A. Evteev, a glaciologist and Soviet exchange observer at McMurdo Station in 1960.

References 

Glaciers of Hillary Coast